In 1791, the Pennsylvania legislature failed to elect a U.S. Senator due to a disagreement on procedure.  The seat would remain vacant until 1793.

See also 
 List of United States senators from Pennsylvania
 United States Senate elections, 1790 and 1791

References

External links 
Pennsylvania Election Statistics: 1682-2006 from the Wilkes University Election Statistics Project

1791
Pennsylvania
United States Senate